The Chicago Sound is the sole album led by American jazz bassist Wilbur Ware. It features a quintet with the saxophonist Johnny Griffin and was recorded in 1957 for the Riverside label. It was subsequently re-released by the Jazzland label as: Johnny Griffin & Wilbur Ware with Junior Mance and renamed "The Chicago Cookers" in 1960.

Reception

Allmusic reviewer Scott Yanow considered the album "a fine debut by Ware. It seems strange that in his remaining 20-plus years the bassist never led another album".

Track listing
All compositions by Wilbur Ware, except as indicated.
 "Mamma-Daddy" - 3:53
 "Body and Soul" (Frank Eyton, Johnny Green, Edward Heyman, Robert Sour) - 3:15
 "Desert Sands" (Paul Dunlap, Edward Heyman, Stuff Smith) - 5:28
 "31st and State" - 6:27
 "Lullaby of the Leaves" (Bernice Petkere, Joe Young) - 2:56
 "Latin Quarters" (John Jenkins) - 4:37
 "Be-Ware" (Jenkins) - 4:28
 "The Man I Love" (George Gershwin, Ira Gershwin) - 7:21
Recorded at Reeves Sound Studios in New York City on October 16 (tracks 1 & 3-7) and November 18 (tracks 2 & 8), 1957

Personnel 
Wilbur Ware - bass
Johnny Griffin - tenor saxophone
John Jenkins - alto saxophone
Junior Mance - piano
Wilbur Campbell (tracks 1 & 3-7), Frankie Dunlop (tracks 2 & 8) - drums

References 

1957 albums
Wilbur Ware albums
Johnny Griffin albums
Albums produced by Orrin Keepnews
Riverside Records albums